Blanchardinella is a genus of moths of the family Hepialidae. It consists of only one species, Blanchardinella venosus, which is found in Chile. The genus was named in honour of Émile Blanchard.

References

Hepialidae
Monotypic moth genera
Taxa named by Ebbe Nielsen
Exoporia genera
Moths of South America
Endemic fauna of Chile